The Slovenian Environment Agency (Slovenian: Agencija Republike Slovenije za okolje or ARSO) is the main organisation for environment of the Republic of Slovenia. It was established in 2001 with a reorganisation of the Hydrometeorological Institute of Slovenia. Since 2012, it is part of the Ministry of Agriculture and the Environment; before, it was part of the Ministry of the Environment and Spatial Planning. , its director general is Silvo Žlebir. The range of duties of this organisation are in the field of monitoring, analysing and forecasting of natural phenomena and processes in the environment and reduction of the danger to people and their property as follows:

 national service for meteorology
 national service for hydrology
 national service for seismology
 monitoring of the pollution of the environment and the provision of quality public environmental data
 exercise the requirements for the protection of the environment, which result from forcing regulations, conservation of natural resources, biodiversity and the provision of sustainable development of the country.

References
The information in this article is based on that in its Slovenian equivalent.

External links
 
 We are a part of the environment, the environment is a part of us (Presentation Booklet). Slovenian Environment Agency. August 2006. Retrieved 16 May 2012.

Environment Agency
Governmental meteorological agencies in Europe
Environment
Environment Agency
Environment Agency
Environment Agency
Government agencies established in 2001
Environmental agencies
2001 establishments in Slovenia